The 2004 Porsche Carrera Cup Deutschland season was the 19th German Porsche Carrera Cup season. It began on 18 April at Hockenheim and finished on 3 October at the same circuit, after nine rounds. It ran as a support championship for the 2004 DTM season. Mike Rockenfeller won the championship by 21 points.

Teams and drivers

Race calendar and results

External links
The Porsche Carrera Cup Germany website
Porsche Carrera Cup Germany Online Magazine

Porsche Carrera Cup Germany seasons
Porsche Carrera Cup Germany